Dominic Cooke  (born 1966) is an English director and writer.

Early life 
Born in Wimbledon, south London, Cooke was brought up seeing a lot of theatre as a teenager from free theatre tickets provided by the Inner London Education Authority.

Career 
Soon after graduating from Warwick University, Cooke's first job as a TV runner led him to start his own theatre company, Pan Optic, which he ran for two years before becoming an assistant director at the Royal Shakespeare Company (RSC).

He started his relationship with the Royal Court Theatre under Stephen Daldry in 1995.  He then became an associate director at the Royal Court for Ian Rickson in 1999 during which time he directed Fireface by Marius von Mayenburg, Other People by Christopher Shinn and Redundant by Leo Butler. In 2003 he left the Royal Court and returned to the RSC for Michael Boyd where he directed his acclaimed version of The Crucible starring Iain Glen which won him the 2007 Laurence Olivier Award for Best Director; the play also won the Olivier for Best Revival.

He has won five Olivier Awards. In addition to Best Director and Best Revival for The Crucible in 2007, he won Best Revival for Ma Rainey’s Black Bottomin 2016, Best Musical Revival for Follies in 2018 and in 2013 his final season in the Jerwood Theatre Upstairs at the Royal Court won Achievement In An Affiliate Theatre.

In 2013 he won the International Theatre Institute Award for Excellence in International Theatre and in the same year was awarded Honorary Doctorate of Letters by his alma mater, Warwick University. Cooke was appointed Commander of the Order of the British Empire (CBE) in the 2014 New Year Honours for services to drama.

Royal Court 
Cooke was artistic director and Chief Executive of the Royal Court Theatre 2006 to 2013 during which time he pioneered new writing by actively promoting the Royal Court's Young Writers’ Programme and new, young writers such as Mike Bartlett (My Child), Polly Stenham (That Face), Penelope Skinner (The Village Bike) and Bola Agbaje (the Olivier Award-winning Gone Too Far!).

During his tenure at the Royal Court Cooke staged Jez Butterworth’s multi-award winning Jerusalem which was directed by Ian Rickson and which transferred to the West End, Broadway, and San Francisco; Lucy Prebble’s 2009 Enron which was directed by Rupert Goold; and Bruce Norris’ Clybourne Park which Cooke directed himself. All three were transferred to the West End amid critical acclaim and box office success.

Cooke's time at the Royal Court was deemed a huge success; he staged numerous new plays and refocused the aims of the theatre. Of the 130+ plays, 94 were full productions of new plays, with public readings and productions of old plays making up the number. The theatre was nominated for 210 major awards and won 59.  Cooke was also credited with bringing a new dynamism and excitement to the Royal Court Theatre with his eclectic programming: "What makes Cooke’s reign unique is that he has used the Royal Court’s young writers programme as a way of finding and cultivating new talent, often by precariously young writers...for Cooke, if a play was good enough, that was enough: he would put it on…Polly Stenham’s ‘That Face’, staged when she was only 19, bowled over its audiences.  Anya Reiss was younger still – 18 – when her assured debut ‘Spur of the Moment’ opened.  Bola Agbaje won an Olivier with her first play ‘Gone Too Far!’"

Writing 
In 2007 Cooke wrote the stage adaptation of Malorie Blackman's Noughts and Crosses, which he directed and produced at the RSC. He wrote an adaptation of Arabian Nights for the Young Vic in 1998 and directed a revised version for the RSC in 2009. With scriptwriter Ben Power, Cooke co-wrote the scripts for Shakespeare's Henry VI Parts 1 and 2 for BBC TV's The Hollow Crown: The Wars of the Roses (May 2016).

National Theatre 
Cooke is a National Theatre Associate Director; he made his directing debut there in November 2011 with Shakespeare's The Comedy of Errors which he set in modern-day London. The cast included Lenny Henry and Claudie Blakley and was broadcast worldwide in March 2012 as part of the NT Live programme. Cooke directed Caryl Churchill's Here We Go at the National in 2015. He directed the critically acclaimed production of August Wilson's Ma Rainey’s Black Bottom in 2016 which won the 2015 Olivier Award for Best Revival. His 2017 production of Stephen Sondheim and James Goldman's Follies starring Imelda Staunton, Janie Dee and Tracie Bennett was nominated for ten Olivier Awards, winning Best Musical Revival. Cooke received the Critics' Circle Best Director Award.

Television 
Cooke's TV directorial debut was in May 2016 with the second BBC TV series of The Hollow Crown: The Wars of the Roses. The series was televised in three parts: Henry VI, Part 1, Henry VI, Part 2, and Richard III. The series was produced by Sam Mendes' company, Neal Street Productions, and stars Benedict Cumberbatch, Judi Dench, Sophie Okonedo, Tom Sturridge, and Hugh Bonneville.

Film 
Cooke's feature directorial debut, On Chesil Beach starring Saoirse Ronan and Billy Howle, premiered at the Toronto International Film Festival on 7 September 2017. It is based on the novel of the same name by Booker Prize winning novelist Ian McEwan. The film received wide release in 2018 and was chosen by Variety as one of the ten best films at the Toronto International Film Festival 2017. His latest film The Courier starring Benedict Cumberbatch, Merab Ninidze, Rachel Brosnahan and Jessie Buckley, premiered at Sundance in January 2020. It was released in the US by Lionsgate and Roadside Attractions. He is slated to direct a movie of Stephen Sondheim and James Goldman's musical Follies.

Private life 
Cooke's civil partner is the actor and playwright Alexi Kaye Campbell. They have been together since 1997.

Cooke is Jewish.

Work

Theatre

Film

Television

Awards and nominations

Theatre

References

External links
 

1966 births
Living people
Commanders of the Order of the British Empire
English film directors
English theatre directors
Laurence Olivier Award winners
LGBT theatre directors
British LGBT dramatists and playwrights
English LGBT people
Date of birth missing (living people)
Place of birth missing (living people)